Matías Walter Iglesias (born 18 April 1985) is an Argentine professional footballer who plays as a defensive midfielder for Greek Super League club Asteras Tripolis, for which he is captain.

Career 
Born in Mendoza (Argentina), Iglesias started his football career in Argentina with Andes Talleres Sport Club. Iglesias was transferred to Atlético Madrid being a part of the U21 team. He played three years in Spain. In August 2007, AEL signs Iglesias by buying 50% of his playing rights from Atlético Madrid. In January 2012, he signed with Athens club Atromitos as a free agent, where he would meet again his former AEL coach, Georgios Donis. During the  seasons he managed to play 73 games (11 goals, 3 assists) both in local competitions and UEFA Europa League.

On 25 February 2014, after a good season at Atromitos, Iglesias was signed for Changchun Yatai, who had beaten AEK and Spanish club Levante by higher price (€450,000). His contract will be for one (plus one) year. On 8 March 2014, he made his debut for Yatai in a 1-0 away defeat against Beijing Guoan. On 23 April 2014, he scored his first goal for the club in a 3-1 away win against defending champions Guangzhou Evergrande. He made only 15 appearances for Yatai in the 2014 season due to injuries and scored 2 goals.

On 19 January 2015, Iglesias signed a one-and-a-half-year contract with Greek Super League club Asteras Tripolis for an undisclosed fee.

On 24 June 2018, the experienced Argentine midfielder extended his contract until the summer of 2020.

On 3 March 2019, Iglesias scored his first goal for the 2018–19 season in a home game against Panetolikos, which ended as a 3–0 win. On 5 May 2019, in the last matchday of the season, he scored in a 3–0 home win against Panionios, which secured his team's spot in the top division.

On 20 July 2020, Iglesias signed a new contract, running until the summer of 2021.

Career statistics

Club

Honours 
Atromitos
Greek Cup runner-up: 2011–12

References

External links 
 
 Worldsoccer profile 

1985 births
Living people
Footballers from Rosario, Santa Fe
Argentine footballers
Argentine expatriate footballers
Atlético Madrid footballers
Association football midfielders
Atlético Madrid B players
CD Toledo players
Athlitiki Enosi Larissa F.C. players
Atromitos F.C. players
Changchun Yatai F.C. players
Asteras Tripolis F.C. players
Super League Greece players
Chinese Super League players
Segunda División B players
Tercera División players
Expatriate footballers in Spain
Expatriate footballers in Greece
Expatriate footballers in China
Argentine expatriate sportspeople in Spain
Argentine expatriate sportspeople in Greece
Argentine expatriate sportspeople in China